This is a list of literary awards given for Malayalam–language.

Jnanapeetam Award (Jnanpith)
Jnanpith Award, India's most prestigious literary honour, was won by the following Malayalam authors.

Other major awards and their winners are listed below.

Akkitham Award
Akkitham Award was established in 2021 by Thapasya Kala Sahithya Vedhi in memory of prominent poet Akkitham Achuthan Namboothiri. The award carries a cash prize of Rs. 1 lakh, a plaque, and a certificate.

Ayyappan Puraskaram
The Ayanam – A. Ayyappan Poetry Award was instituted by Ayanam Samskarika Vedi (Ayanam Cultural Forum) in the memory of celebrated Malayalam poet A. Ayyappan.

Balamani Amma Award

Basheer Award
Basheer Award was instituted by Vaikom Muhammad Basheer Smaraka Trust and consists of an amount of  50,000, a certificate of merit, and a plaque designed by C. N. Karunakaran.

C. G. Santhakumar Award
C. G. Santhakumar Award is instituted by the Kerala State Institute of Children's Literature for overall contributions of a writer to children's literature in Malayalam.

C. V. Sreeraman Award
The Ayanam - C. V. Sreeraman Award for Story was instituted in 2008 by Ayanam Samskarika Vedi (Ayanam Cultural Forum) in memory of Malayalam writer C. V. Sreeraman. The winners of the award are: 

{| class="wikitable"
|- 
! Year !! Recipient !! Work(s) !! Ref.
|-
| 2008
| V. R. Sudheesh
| 
| 
|-
| rowspan=2|2009
| Asokan Charuvil
| 
| 
|-
| K. P. Ramanunni
| Thiranjedutha Kathakal
| 
|-
| 2010
| Ambikasuthan Mangad
| 
| 
|-
| 2011
| Unni R.
| Kottayam 17
| 
|-
| 2012
| U. K. Kumaran
| 
| 
|-
| 2013
| Vaisakhan
| 
| 
|-
| 2014
| P. K. Parakkadavu
| Thiranjedutha Kathakal
| 
|-
| 2015
| Pramod Raman
| Drishtichaver
| 
|-
| 2016
| U. A. Khader
| 
| {{center|<ref>"സി വി ശ്രീരാമന്‍ പുരസ്കാരം യു എ ഖാദറിന് കോടിയേരി സമ്മാനിച്ചു". Deshabhimani. 31 March 2017. Retrieved 5 January 2013.</ref>}}
|-
| 2017
| E. P. Sreekumar
| Adhwanavetta| 
|-
| 2018
| C. S. Chandrika
| Ente Pachakkarimbe| 
|-
| 2019
| Shihabuddin Poythumkadavu
| Oru Paattinte Dooram| 
|-
| 2020
| Santhosh Echikkanam
| Kavana| 
|}

Deviprasadam Trust Award
Deviprasadam Trust or the OMC Trust is established in the memory of Sanskrit scholar O. M. C. Narayanan Nambudiripad. Since 1990, the Trust gives awards in various disciplines such as Sanskrit, Vedanta, Music, Malayalam literature, and Kathakali. The award for literature has been given since 1997.

Kadammanitta Ramakrishnan Award

Kamala Surayya Award

Kendra Sahitya Akademi Award for Children's Literature (Bal Sahitya Puraskar)
The following are the winners of Bal Sahitya Puraskar, awarded annually by Sahitya Akademi for children's literature.

Lalithambika Antharjanam Smaraka Sahitya Award

The award, instituted in the memory of Lalithambika Antharjanam, is given in two categories: one for Lifetime Contribution to Malayalam Literature and the other for Best Young Woman Writer.

 1992: Vaikkom Muhammad Basheer, B. M. Suhara
 1993: Balamani Amma, Vijayalakshmi
 1994: Sukumar Azhikode, Ashita
 1995: S. Guptan Nair, Gracy
 1996: Akkitham Achuthan Namboothiri, Shobha Warrier
 1997: N. P. Mohammed, K. P. Sudheera
 1998: T. Padmanabhan, S. Lakshmi Devi
 1999: M. Leelavathi, Rosemary
 2000: K. T. Muhammed, Geetha
 2001: Sugathakumari, Prameela Devi
 2002: Ponkunnam Varkey, Mayadevi
 2003: M. T. Vasudevan Nair, A. S. Priya
 2004: C. Radhakrishnan, K. R. Meera

Malayattoor Award
The literary prize was instituted in 2006 by Malayattoor Smaraka Samithi in the name of writer Malayattoor Ramakrishnan. It consists of a cash prize of ₹25,000, a citation, and statuette.

Nalappadan Award
The literary prize was instituted in the name of writer Nalapat Narayana Menon.

Nooranad Haneef Award
The literary prize is instituted in the name of writer Nooranad Haneef. It consists of a cash prize of  25,001 and citation and is given for writers under the age of 45.

N. V. Krishna Warrier Award
The literary prize was instituted in the name of writer N. V. Krishna Warrier.

P. Kunhiraman Nair Award

Samastha Kerala Sahithya Parishad Award
Samastha Kerala Sahithya Parishad is an organisation established in 1926 (as Sahithya Samajam). The Samastha Kerala Sahithya Parishad Award was established in 1988. The award was given to individual works published in Malayalam but since 2014, it is given for the overall contribution of a writer in Malayalam literature.

S. Guptan Nair Award
The Prof. S. Guptan Nair Award was instituted in 2007 by Prof S. Guptan Nair Foundation, to honour Malayalam scholar S. Guptan Nair. The award carries Rs. 25,000 in cash and a citation. Some of the recipients of the award are listed below.

Thanima Puraskaram
The award was instituted in 2009 by Calicut-based Thanima Kala Sahithya Vedi, a literary organisation founded in 1991. Seminal works in a specific literary genre are considered for the award each year.

Thakazhi Award
The award was instituted in 2014 by Thakazhi Smaraka Samiti and Department of Cultural Affairs, Government of Kerala in the memory of renowned writer Thakazhi Sivasankara Pillai. The award consists of Rs.50,000, a citation and a plaque. The first award was received by Prof. G. Balachandran for his work Thakazhiyude Sargapadhangal'', a study on the life and works of Thakazhi Sivasankara Pillai. Except for the inaugural award, the award has been given for a writer's overall contributions to Malayalam literature.

Thoppil Bhasi Award

V. T. Kumaran Award

References
25

Indian literary awards
Literary awards
Malayalam literary awards
Malayalam literary awards